Ahmed Gagaâ (born December 21, 1994, in Sétif) is an Algerian footballer who plays for Saudi Arabian club Al-Entesar.

Club career
Born on December 21, 1994, Gagaâ spent his entire youth career with Paradou AC.

USM Bel-Abbès
In January 2015, Gagaâ was loaned out by Paradou AC to USM Bel-Abbès for the second half of the 2014–15 Algerian Ligue Professionnelle 1. On January 24, he made his professional debut, coming on as a substitute in the 66th minute in a league match against ES Sétif. He would go on to make 13 league appearances in the season, 12 of them as a starter but was unable to help Bel-Abbès avoid relegation.

JS Kabylie
In June 2015, Gagaâ was loaned out again by Paradou AC, this time to JS Kabylie for the 2015–16 season.

Paradou AC
He return to Paradou AC in 2016, and he realized the accession to the Algerian Ligue Professionnelle 1 with his team.

CA Bordj Bou Arréridj
In 2019, he signed a two-year contract with CA Bordj Bou Arréridj.

US Biskra
In 2022, he joined US Biskra.

Al-Entesar
On 7 February 2023, Gagaâ joined Saudi Arabian club Al-Entesar.

International career
On May 19, 2015, Gagaâ made his Algeria U23 debut, starting in a friendly match against Sudan.

In 2017, he participated with the Algerian team in the Islamic Solidarity Games in Bakou, when they obtained the bronze medal (third position). Gagaâ was the captain and he scored 2 goals against Turkey and Cameroon.

References

External links
 

1994 births
Algeria under-23 international footballers
Algerian footballers
Algerian Ligue Professionnelle 1 players
Saudi Second Division players
JS Kabylie players
Living people
Paradou AC players
USM Bel Abbès players
Al-Entesar Club players
Footballers from Sétif
2015 Africa U-23 Cup of Nations players
Association football goalkeepers
21st-century Algerian people
Algerian expatriate footballers
Expatriate footballers in Saudi Arabia
Algerian expatriate sportspeople in Saudi Arabia